Sarajevo has had a number of famous citizens over the years. They include an Academy Award winner, two Nobel Prize winners, musicians, novelists, athletes, actors, artists, designers, film directors, screenwriters, politicians etc. Sarajevo has also produced presidents for three countries.

Apart from people born in Sarajevo, this list also includes people that were or are associated with Sarajevo throughout their career, nevermind where they were actually born.

A
Abdulah Sidran (born 1944), poet and screenwriter 
Adela Jušić (born 1982), contemporary visual artist
Ademir Kenović (born 1950), film director and producer
Adi Granov (born 1977), comic book artist and conceptual designer
Ahmed Imamović (born 1971), film director, film producer and screenwriter 
Aleksandar Hemon (born 1964), writer, winner of a MacArthur Foundation grant
Ališer Sijarić (born 1969), contemporary classical music, electroacoustic music and computer music composer 
Amar Osim (born 1967), footballer and football coach 
Asim Ferhatović (1933–1987), footballer

B
Bekim Fehmiu (1936–2010), actor 
Božo Vrećo (born 1983), singer and songwriter 
Boris Novković (born 1967), Croatian singer, songwriter
Braco Dimitrijević (born 1948), conceptual artist 
Branko Đurić "Đuro" (born 1962), actor, film director and musician, lead singer of Bombaj Štampa

D
 Dalibor Talajić (born 1972), comic book artist for Marvel Comics
 Damir Imamović (born 1987), singer and songwriter
Damir Džumhur (born 1992), tennis player 
Danis Tanović (born 1969), film director and screenwriter 
David Elazar (1925–1976), Israeli general and IDF Chief of Staff 
Davorin Popović (1946–2001), singer, songwriter, lead singer of Indexi and basketball player
Dino Merlin (born 1962), singer, songwriter and record producer 
Dino Rešidbegović (born 1975), contemporary classical music and electronic/electroacoustic music composer
Dragan Marinković (born 1968), actor and TV personality
Dražen Ričl (1962–1986), musician, former lead singer of Crvena Jabuka
Dražen Žerić (born 1964), musician, current lead singer of Crvena Jabuka

E
Edin Džeko (born 1986), footballer 
Elmir Jukić (born 1971), film director and occasional screenwriter 
Elvir Baljić (born 1974), footballer and football coach 
Emir Kusturica (born 1954), film director, actor and musician 
Endi E. Poskovic (born 1969), visual artist and printmaker

F
Faruk Hadžibegić (born 1957), footballer and football coach
Faruk Sokolović (born 1952), film director, television producer, actor and screenwriter
Feđa Isović (born 1965), screenwriter, part-time musician and part-time actor 
Fra Grgo Martić (1822–1905), friar and writer

G
Gazi Husrev-beg (1480–1541), Sanjak-bey in the Ottoman Empire, greatest donor and builder of Sarajevo
Goran Bregović (born 1950), recording artist, composer and former guitarist of Bijelo Dugme

H
Hamdija Kreševljaković (1888–1959), historian 
Hajrudin "Hari" Varešanović (born 1961), musician, lead singer of Hari Mata Hari 
Haris Brkić (1974–2000), basketball player
Husref Musemić (born 1961), footballer and football coach

I
Irfan Peljto (born 1984), football referee
Ivan Štraus (1928–2018), architect 
Ivana Miličević (born 1974), actress and model 
Ivica Osim (1941–2022), footballer and football coach

J
Jasmila Žbanić (born 1974), film director and screenwriter
Jasmin Geljo (born 1959), actor
Jasna Žalica (born 1968), actress 
Jura Stublić (born 1954), singer and songwriter

K
Kemal Monteno (1948–2015), singer and songwriter
Dino Klisura (born 1999), musician and producer

M
Mehmedalija "Mak" Dizdar (1917–1971), poet 
Maya Berović (born 1987), pop singer 
Maya Kulenovic (born 1975), painter 
Mladen Milicevic (born 1958), composer of experimental music, sound installation, and film music
Mehmed Baždarević (born 1960), footballer and football coach 
Meris Muhović (born 1992), karate competitor
Milan Pavlović (born 1970), actor 
Milan Ribar (1930–1996), footballer and football coach
Milić Vukašinović (born 1950), musician
Miljenko Jergović (born 1966), writer 
Miraj Grbić (born 1976), actor and former musician, former lead singer of Karne 
Mirza Delibašić (1954–2001), basketball player
Mladen Vojičić "Tifa" (born 1960), rock vocalist, former lead singer of Bijelo Dugme
Muhamed Karamusić Nihadi (died 1587), poet
Mula Mustafa Bašeskija (1731–1809), chronicler, diarist, poet, calligrapher and retired Janissary in the Ottoman Empire

N
Nedžad Husić (born 2001), taekwondo athlete
Nele Karajlić (born 1962), comedian, musician, composer, actor and television director 
Nenad Marković (born 1968), basketball player
Nergisî (c. 1580-1635), Ottoman writer
Nijaz Ibrulj (born 1956), philosopher

P
Peter Paduh (born 1977), Bosnian-born British businessman and social entrepreneur
Pjer Žalica (born 1964), film director and screenwriter 
Predrag Danilović (born 1971), basketball player, former member of NBA's Miami Heat and Dallas Mavericks
Predrag Finci (born 1946), philosophy philosopher and writer

R
Robert Rothbart (born as Boris Kajmaković in 1986), Bosnian-Israeli-American basketball player

S
Safet Isović (1936–2007), sevdalinka singer
Safet Sušić (born 1955), footballer and football coach
Safvet-beg Bašagić (1870–1934), writer
Sanela Diana Jenkins (born 1975), entrepreneur, philanthropist and owner of NeuroDrinks from California
Saša Lošić (born 1964), composer, musician, lead singer of Plavi orkestar
Saša Toperić (born 1972), concert pianist and diplomat
Sejo Sexon (born 1961), musician, lead singer of Zabranjeno pušenje
Senad Bašić (born 1962), actor and comedian 
Senad Hadžimusić Teno (born 1957), musician
Sima Milutinović Sarajlija (1791–1847), poet

T
Tavakkoli Dede (died 1625), poet
Tomo Miličević (born 1979), musician

V
Vladimir Prelog (1906–1998), Nobel prize winner for Chemistry
Vesna Bugarski (1930–1992), Bosnia and Herzegovina's first female architect

Z
Zaim Topčić (1920–1990), writer
Zdravko Čolić (born 1951), pop-folk singer
Zlata Filipović (born 1980), novelist and short story writer
Zlatko Topčić (born 1955), writer and screenwriter
Zenit Đozić (born 1961), actor, humorist, television producer

Ž
Željko Bebek (born 1945), lead singer of Bijelo Dugme from 1974 to 1984
Žan Marolt (1964–2009), actor

Politics

A
Abdulah Skaka (born 1983), 38th mayor of Sarajevo
Alija Behmen (born 1940), 36th mayor of Sarajevo
Alija Izetbegović (1925–2003), first Bosnian president

B
Bakir Izetbegović (born 1956), politician
Benjamina Karić (born 1991), 39th and current mayor of Sarajevo
Bogić Bogićević (born 1953), politician
Boris Tadić (born 1958), President of Serbia
Branko Crvenkovski (born 1962), President of the Republic of Macedonia

E
Edin Forto (born 1972), 16th prime minister of Sarajevo Canton
Emerik Blum (1911–1984), businessman, 26th mayor of Sarajevo

I
Isa-Beg Ishaković (15th century), general, first governor of the Ottoman province of Bosnia, and founder of the cities of Sarajevo and Novi Pazar
Ivo Komšić (born 1948), 37th mayor of Sarajevo

M
Mario Nenadić (born 1964), 17th prime minister of Sarajevo Canton
Mehmed Kapetanović (1839–1902), 2nd mayor of Sarajevo
Mila Mulroney (born 1953), former first lady of Canada
Mustafa Fadilpašić (1830–1892), 1st mayor of Sarajevo

N
Nenad Kecmanović, politician, political scientist, sociologist, political analyst, publicist, professor of political science
Nezir Škaljić (1844–1905), 3rd mayor of Sarajevo

S
Semiha Borovac (born 1955), 35th mayor of Sarajevo
Sven Alkalaj (born 1948), diplomat

V
Vojislav Šešelj (born 1954), politician, former deputy prime minister of Serbia and convicted war criminal

Ž
Željko Komšić (born 1964), politician and Golden Lily recipient

 People from Sarajevo
Sarajevans
Sarajevans